Sicradiscus mansuyi is a species of air-breathing land snail, a terrestrial pulmonate gastropod mollusk in the family Plectopylidae.

Distribution
The distribution of Sicradiscus mansuyi includes Cao Bằng Province and Hà Giang Province in Northeast Vietnam. It was also found in Ban Gioc–Detian Falls very close to the Vietnamese border within Daxin County, Guangxi, China.

The type locality is Hạ Lang in the eastern part of Cao Bằng Province, in the Northeast region of Vietnam.

Description
The width of the shell is 6.7–7.0 mm. The height of the shell is 3.4–3.9 mm.

Ecology
It is a ground-dwelling species as all other plectopylid snails in Vietnam.

It co-occur with other plectopylids in Vietnam: with Gudeodiscus cyrtochilus, Gudeodiscus giardi and with Gudeodiscus suprafilaris. Gudeodiscus phlyarius live at geographically close sites to Sicradiscus mansuyi.

References

External links

Plectopylidae
Gastropods described in 1908